The 1987 Italian Grand Prix was a Formula One motor race held at Monza on 6 September 1987. It was the eleventh race of the 1987 Formula One World Championship. It was the 57th Italian Grand Prix and the 52nd to be held at Monza.

The race was won from pole position by Brazilian driver Nelson Piquet, driving a Williams-Honda. Piquet took his third victory of the season by 1.8 seconds from compatriot Ayrton Senna, who led in his Lotus-Honda before running wide at the Parabolica with eight laps to go. Piquet's British team-mate, Nigel Mansell, finished third, nearly 50 seconds adrift. It was also the sixth consecutive victory for the Williams team, a run of wins that had begun at the French Grand Prix in early July.

French Tyrrell driver Philippe Streiff was the first naturally aspirated Jim Clark Trophy car to finish in 12th, three laps down on Piquet.

The win strengthened Piquet's championship points lead to 14 points over Senna and 20 over Mansell.

Due to the entries of AGS and Coloni, for the first time in the 1987 season, there would be drivers who would fail to qualify for the race - in this case, it was to be Nicola Larini in the Coloni and Pascal Fabre in the AGS.

Classification

Qualifying

Race 
Numbers in brackets refer to positions of normally aspirated entrants competing for the Jim Clark Trophy.

Championship standings after the race

Drivers' Championship standings

Constructors' Championship standings

Jim Clark Trophy standings

Colin Chapman Trophy standings

References

Italian Grand Prix
Italian Grand Prix
Grand Prix
Italian Grand Prix